Daniele Gasparetto (born 6 April 1988) is an Italian footballer who plays as a defender for  club Legnago Salus.

Club career

Atalanta
Born in Montebelluna, Veneto, Gasparetto spent his early career with hometown club Montebelluna until 2004. In 2007, he graduated from Primavera under-19 team of Atalanta B.C. and loaned to Serie C1 side Legnano.

In July 2008 he left for Serie B club Modena. In the next season he left for Serie B newcomer Padova.

Cittadella
In July 2010 he left for fellow Serie B team Cittadella along with Manolo Gabbiadini in co-ownership deal, for €500, as part of the deal that newly relegated Atalanta signed striker Matteo Ardemagni from Cittadella.

Coach Claudio Foscarini did not use the same starting line-up for the first few matches of the season. He started the first 2 matches of the season, the 2–0 won against Verona in 2010–11 Coppa Italia. and a 0–2 lost to Serie B newcomer PortoSummaga in the opening league match. In round 2, he lost his starting place to Andrea Manucci (who absent in round 1 and the cup) but in round 3, Gasparetto started in that lost 0–2 to Novara, as Francesco Scardina was absent. Eventually Gasparetto started 17 times in the league. In June 2011 the club bought Gasparetto outright and sold Gabbiadini back to Atalanta.

Reggina
On 31 January 2019 he signed a 2.5-year contract with Reggina.

Legnago
On 25 August 2021, he joined to Serie C club Legnago Salus.

International career
Gasparetto capped for Azzurrini in 2007 UEFA European Under-19 Football Championship elite qualification. In February 2010, he was called up by Pierluigi Casiraghi to Italy U21 team for a training camp along with a few new faces, likes Giulio Donati. However, Gasparetto did not receive a call-up to the match in March 2010.

References

External links
 Football.it Profile  
 
 La Gazzetta dello Sport Profile  
 FIGC nation team data  
 Cittadella Profile  
 

1988 births
Living people
People from Montebelluna
Sportspeople from the Province of Treviso
Italian footballers
Association football defenders
Serie B players
Serie C players
Calcio Montebelluna players
Atalanta B.C. players
A.C. Legnano players
Modena F.C. players
Calcio Padova players
A.S. Cittadella players
S.P.A.L. players
Ternana Calcio players
Reggina 1914 players
F.C. Legnago Salus players
Italy youth international footballers
Footballers from Veneto